Cray Plaza (formerly Galtier Plaza), located in the Lowertown neighborhood of Saint Paul, Minnesota, United States, provides space for working, living, eating, and recreating on one square city block opened in 1986.

Features include 365 apartments, 121 luxury condominiums, 16 townhomes,  of retail and restaurant space,  of office space, and a 5-level underground parking garage for 829 cars.

History 
At that time the Lowertown Redevelopment Corporation, a non-profit coordinator of development in St. Paul's historic warehouse district, had sought to fill Block 40 for some three years. The site on Mears Park just east of the downtown business district represented the keystone in Lowertown's revitalization, and Lowertown Redevelopment Corporation's executive director Weiming Lu had persuaded developers with the concept of a mixed-use development and one tenant, the downtown YMCA.

Efforts to put together a project reusing existing properties on the block had fallen through, as had a modest proposal for housing and service retail by the Carley Capital Group of Madison, Wisconsin. The city had already secured an Urban Development Action Grant (UDAG) from the federal government for the Carley development, and called for new developers with a three-month deadline looming. Boisclair and Omni Venture, Ltd. the developers of Minneapolis' International Market Square, responded. Robert Boisclair took on the development.

Miller, Hanson, Westerbeck & Bell were selected as architects for the project. They had done studies of Block 40 for the Lowertown Corporation and had a history of designing housing for Boisclair which included Lakepoint Tower and the Falls and Pinnacle at Riverplace. Galtier Plaza was named after Father Lucien Galtier, a Roman Catholic priest who has historical involvement with the founding of the city of St. Paul.

Design 

The location and form of the architectural elements was the subject of negotiation between the developer, the city and Lowertown Corporation. In addition, the financial partnerships involved in the project had to be expressed architecturally so that ownership of the complex space could be divided by multiple tenants.

The six-story base along the street front was needed to maintain the cornice of the surrounding six-story buildings was dictated by historic and design considerations. The decision to fill out the block to the maximum met economic goals. The housing, proposed as one corner tower cascading to the base, was instead split between two towers. The lower one, the Sibley Tower, is located  back of the Mears Park facade.

The atrium beginning at the building line, became instead a gabled roof extruded beyond the building facade and stepping back to its seven-story peak. The skyway linking Galtier Plaza and the Farm Credit Bank toward downtown was proposed as a "festive" design with gabled peaks, much glass, and cream and red aluminum trim to match Galtier's. Lowertown's Weiming Lu and the city planning staff stood fast for the standard Vierendeel truss and bronze aluminum. Galtier Plaza opened in 1986.

Project difficulties 
The project cost at least $140 million to build, not including the YMCA and other portions. Various parts of the project were funded separately. The rental apartments were funded by bonds sold through the Port Authority to private institutional investors; the YMCA was on a separate parcel; and much of the other private funding came from investors as equity and from Chemical Bank as a loan. There were issues with construction, cost overruns, inadequate financial resources, high interest rates, delays, and strategic errors made in market analysis and design.

As the project was delayed, it found difficulty attracting tenants. Eventually, private investors are said to have lost about $42 to $45 million in equity and Chemical Bank is said to have lost about $90 million on their loan. The Port Authority took over the rental apartments after the default on that part of the project—for which they had loaned $32 million and which would have cost about $36 million.

Excluding the YMCA, rental housing, and the energy plant, the balance of the project (retail, offices, condos, and the parking garage) was sold in 1989 to a Canadian investor in the range of $10 to $12 million.

Henry Zaidan's thought to market the condos, and to reposition the retail space from the regional high end target and toward services for the neighborhood and downtown. He relocated the food court to the ground level. After filling the vacant retail and office space during the recession, Zaidan left the Galtier Plaza project in 1992, and in 1996 the holder of the mortgage obtained title through foreclosure, changed the management company and made some nominal improvements before selling Galtier in 1999 to an investor group managed by Wasmer, Schroeder & Company.

The Wasmer group invested in an extensive remodeling project, including conversion of much of the vacant retail space into office space. The residential towers at Galtier were sold to Bigos Investments, owned by Ted Bigos, in 2003, and the Wasmer group sold the commercial and parking facilities in 2006 to a group based in California. The commercial portion of Galtier now contains several restaurants, a convenience store, a conference facility, and a credit union, Unity One Credit Union. Retail and office space are about 85% occupied.

Today 

Over the years, the building has seen erratic success, first as a shopping mall, then as an entertainment center, and currently is most notably occupied by a private preparatory academy, various technology companies, an event and presentation facility (carved out of the old movie theaters), a restaurant, and a food court.

In the summer of 2009 it was announced that the naming rights to Galtier Plaza had been purchased, and the building would become known as Cray Plaza, as the building's new "anchor" tenant was Cray Inc. The complex won the award for the first place design award excellence from Development Design Group, First Place from National Mall Monitor Center's of Excellence, and Signs of the Times award for electric sign graphics.

See also
List of tallest buildings in Minnesota
List of tallest buildings in St. Paul

References

Further reading 

Struggling Galtier Plaza On Sale Block - Mpls-St. Paul Business Journal - 5/10/1999
Investor Considers Buying Galtier Plaza - Mpls-St. Paul Business Journal - 10/4/1999
Galtier.com? - Mpls-St. Paul Business Journal - 10/27/2000
Massive riverfront project ignores lessons of the past - Pioneer Press article (references Galtier Plaza) - 6/15/06
L.A. investor group buys $16M Minn. property - Los Angeles Business - 6/19/06
It's a new day for Galtier Plaza - Pioneer Press - 6/25/06
Enough already… of the negative critiques about Galtier Plaza's existence - Pioneer Press - 7/5/06
'Rudy' Garcia, St. Paul restaurateur - Pioneer Press (article about Galtier Plaza restaurateur) - 8/30/06
Galtier Plaza likely to gain Cray Inc. as tenant - StarTribune - 5/18/2009
Galtier Plaza to be renamed after new tenant, Cray - Pioneer Press - 7/27/09

External links 
 
Galtier Plaza: A Case Study - A college thesis analyzing Galtier's troubles

Apartment buildings in Minnesota
Residential condominiums in the United States
Shopping malls in Minnesota
Plaza
Residential buildings completed in 1986
1980s architecture in the United States
Residential skyscrapers in Saint Paul, Minnesota